This is a list of notable restaurants in Vienna, Austria.

Restaurants in Vienna

 Altmann & Kühne – confiserie and chocolaterie in Vienna established in 1928
 Demel – famous pastry shop and chocolaterie established in 1786 in Vienna
 Donauturm – prominent tower in Vienna with two revolving restaurants
 Griechenbeisl – oldest restaurant in Vienna, founded in 1447
 Palais Esterházy – baroque palace in Vienna that houses a famous and popular restaurant in the former wine cellars, called Esterházykeller
 Schweizerhaus – has a huge beer garden which is subdivided into smaller areas, each of which is named accordingly to a town district of Vienna

Cafés

The Viennese coffee house is a typical institution of Vienna that played an important part in shaping Viennese culture.

See also
 Lists of restaurants
 Schanigarten – Austro-Bavarian term for tables and chairs set up on the sidewalk in front of eating and drinking places
 Franciszek Trześniewski
 Würstelstand – traditional Austrian street food retail outlet selling hot dogs, sausages, and side dishes, they are a ubiquitous sight in Vienna

References

External links
 
 

Restaurants in Vienna
Vienna